Stone Age is a designer board game designed by Michael Tummelhofer and published by Hans im Glück in 2008. It is a development game with a Stone Age theme that involves taking control of a tribe to collect resources and build a village that has the most powerful chief.

Players collect wood, break stone and wash their gold from the river. They trade freely, expand their village and so achieve new levels of civilization. With a balance of luck and planning, the players compete for food in this prehistoric time.

Components
 1 gameboard
 4 individual player boards
 68 wooden resources
 40 wooden people
 8 wooden markers in 2 sizes
 53 food tiles
 28 building tiles
 18 tool tiles
 1 start player figure
 36 civilization cards
 7 dice
 1 leather dice cup
 1 information sheet

Awards
 2008 Spiel des Jahres Nominee.
 2008 Deutscher Spiele Preis 2nd Place.

External links

 Stone Age at Rio Grande Games
 Stone Age at Z-Man Games
 Stone Age Rules

Board games introduced in 2008
Board games about history
Worker placement board games
Prehistoric people in popular culture
Rio Grande Games games